The Greatest Menace is a 1923 American silent crime film directed by Albert S. Rogell and starring Ann Little, Wilfred Lucas and Robert Gordon.

Cast
 Ann Little as Velma Wright
 Wilfred Lucas as Charles W. Wright
 Robert Gordon as Charles W. Wright Jr
 Harry Northrup as Herbert Van Raalte
 Jack Livingston as Douglas Ferguson
 Rhea Mitchell as Mary Lewis
 Andy MacLennan as The Gopher
 Mildred June as Mrs. Charles W. Wright Jr
 David Kirby as Riley Hogan 
 Gordon Mullen as Tim
 Lew Meehan as Gus

References

Bibliography
 Munden, Kenneth White. The American Film Institute Catalog of Motion Pictures Produced in the United States, Part 1. University of California Press, 1997.

External links
 

1923 films
1923 crime films
1920s English-language films
American silent feature films
American crime films
American black-and-white films
Films directed by Albert S. Rogell
1920s American films